Austrochaperina adamantina is a species of frog in the family Microhylidae. It is endemic to New Guinea and occurs in the Torricelli and Bewani Mountains in the West Sepik Province, Papua New Guinea. The specific name adamantina is Latin for "like a diamond" and refers to Jared Diamond, credited as the collector of the holotype and "great many other
valuable herpetological specimens from Papua New Guinea".

Description
The head is narrow. The snout is truncate as seen from above and slightly rounded in profile. The eyes are relatively large. The tympanic ring is barely visible; a weak supratympanic fold is present. The fingers and the toes have well-developed terminal discs but lack webbing. Skin is smooth apart from slight wartiness on the lower back. The dorsum is tan with indistinct darker mottling. There is a well-defined paler area on the side of face, from the upper lip from just below nostril to the tympanic fold. The lower surfaces are all pale with faint darker mottling that is slightly darker on the throat and the hind legs. The thighs are posteriorly pale with darker mottling.

Habitat and conservation
Its ecological requirements are unknown but it is presumably a forest inhabitant that breeds by direct development (i.e, there is no free-living larval stage), as its congeners. Threats to it are unknown.

References

adamantina
Amphibians of New Guinea
Amphibians of Papua New Guinea
Endemic fauna of New Guinea
Endemic fauna of Papua New Guinea
Amphibians described in 2000
Taxa named by Richard G. Zweifel
Taxonomy articles created by Polbot